Lavov most Metro Station is a station on the Sofia Metro in Bulgaria. It opened on 31 August 2012. Bulgaria's PM Boyko Borisov and  the President of the European Commission Jose Manuel Barroso inaugurated the new section of the Sofia Metro, which was funded with EU money.

Interchange with other public transport
 Tramway service: 4, 12, 18
 Trolleybus service: 6
 City Bus service: 11, 78, 85, 86, 213, 285, 305, 309, 310, 404, 413

Gallery

References

External links

 Sofia Metropolitan
 More info in Bulgarian
 SofiaMetro@UrbanRail
 Sofia Urban Mobility Center
 Sofia Metro station projects
 Sofia Metropolitan
 vijsofia.eu
 Project Slide 1
 Project Slide 2
 Project Slide 3

Sofia Metro stations
Railway stations opened in 2012
2012 establishments in Bulgaria